The Chancellor of Maryland was the highest judicial office in the state of Maryland from before the American Revolution until the state's High Court of Chancery ceased to exist, on June 4, 1854.

The High Court of Chancery of Maryland was organized around the time of the American Revolution to take the place of its prototype, the High Court of Chancery of England. During the colonial period, Charles I of England had granted Cecil Calvert, 2nd Baron Baltimore, the authority to establish judicial tribunals in the Province of Maryland. Calvert appointed his brother, Leonard Calvert, to this office. Leonard Calvert's successors were appointed by the Lords Proprietary, and exercised powers and functions similar to those of its English counterpart.

When America declared independence, the citizens of Maryland opted to retain this judicial structure, the only change being that the Chancellor would be appointed by the Governor of the State, by and with the consent of the council, and should hold his office during good behavior. Section 30 of the Maryland Declaration of Rights adopted at that time discusses the role of the Chancellor:

The first Chancellor of Maryland, Richard Sprigg, was directly appointed by the Maryland General Assembly, on April 3, 1777, as a governor had not yet been elected at that time. Sprigg was sworn into office on April 21, 1777. Sprigg resigned on March 20, 1778, having never issued a decree (in part because the courts saw little activity during the war), and was replaced by John Rogers of Prince George's County, who assumed office on the day of Sprigg's resignation.

Other notable holders of this office include Alexander Contee Hanson Sr., William Kilty, and Theodorick Bland. The High Court of Chancery ceased to exist on the June 4th, 1854.

List of chancellors

References

External links
The High Court of Chancery and the Chancellors of Maryland, by William L. Marbury, Presented to the Maryland State Bar Association at the 1905 Annual Meeting, available at Maryland State Archives.

State constitutional officers of Maryland